13th SDFCS Awards
December 15, 2008

Best Film: 
Slumdog Millionaire

Best Director: 
Danny Boyle
Slumdog Millionaire
The 13th San Diego Film Critics Society Awards were announced on December 15, 2008.

Winners and nominees

Best Actor
Mickey Rourke - The Wrestler as Randy "The Ram" Robinson

Best Actress
Kate Winslet - The Reader as Hanna Schmitz

Best Animated Film
WALL-E

Best Cast
Frost/Nixon

Best Cinematography
Slumdog Millionaire - Anthony Dod MantleBest DirectorDanny Boyle - Slumdog Millionaire

Best Documentary FilmMan on Wire

Best Editing
Slumdog Millionaire

Best Film
Slumdog Millionaire

Best Foreign Language Film
Let the Right One In (Låt den rätte komma in) • Sweden

Best Production Design
The Curious Case of Benjamin Button

Best Score
Slumdog Millionaire - A. R. Rahman

Best Screenplay - Adapted
Slumdog Millionaire - Simon Beaufoy

Best Screenplay - Original
The Visitor - Tom McCarthy

Best Supporting Actor
Heath Ledger - The Dark Knight as The Joker (posthumous)

Best Supporting Actress
Marisa Tomei - The Wrestler as Cassidy/Pam

2
2008 film awards
2008 in American cinema